Girl Can Rock may refer to:
"Girl Can Rock" (Hilary Duff song), 2003
The Girl Can Rock, 2004 video album